La Meuse may refer to: 

 Ateliers de construction de La Meuse (locomotive builder and engineering company)
 La Meuse (newspaper), a French-language regional newspaper published in Liège, Belgium